The following is a list of notable deaths in March 1997.

Entries for each day are listed alphabetically by surname. A typical entry lists information in the following sequence:
 Name, age, country of citizenship at birth, subsequent country of citizenship (if applicable), reason for notability, cause of death (if known), and reference.

March 1997

1
Stanislaus Joseph Brzana, 79, American bishop of the Roman Catholic Church.
Hans Robert Jauss, 75, German academic.
Martin Furnival Jones, 84, British Director General of MI5 (1965-1972).
Monte Kennedy, 74, American baseball player.
Václav Roziňák, 74, Czechoslovak ice hockey player.
Annie Beatrice van der Biest Thielan Wetmore, 87, Dutch-American ornithologist.

2
Yahaya Ahmad, 49, Malaysian businessman, helicopter crash.
Abdel Azim Ashry, 85, Egyptian basketball player and referee.
Judi Bari, 47, American environmentalist, feminist, and labor leader, breast cancer.
Douglas Blackwood, 87, British publisher and fighter pilot during World War II.
Horace Cutler, 84, British politician.
Richard De Smet, 81, Belgian Jesuit priest, missionary and indologist.
Amleto Frignani, 64, Italian football player.
Herman H. Fussler, 82, American librarian, writer and editor.
Albert Gazier, 88, French trade union leader and politician.
Grete Heublein, 89, German track and field athlete and Olympian.
Walter Leinweber, 89, German ice hockey player.
J. Carson Mark, 83, Canadian-American mathematician, complications from a fall.
Waldo Nelson, 98, American pediatrician, stroke.
Vicente Parra, 66, Spanish actor, lung cancer.
Wendell Thompson Perkins, 69, American painter.
Martin Smith, 50, English rock drummer, internal bleeding.

3
Bradford Angier, 86, American wilderness survivalist.
Jascha Brodsky, 89, Russian-American violinist.
Eric Edwards, Baron Chelmer, 82, English peer and solicitor.
Harry Davis, 88, American baseball player.
Lola Beer Ebner, 86, Israeli fashion designer.
Billy Jurges, 88, American baseball player.
Mulumba Lukoji, 53, Congolese politician and professor.
William Edward McManus, 83, American prelate of the Catholic Church.
Santiago Ojeda Pérez, 52, Spanish judoka.
Erik Waaler, 94, Norwegian professor of medicine.

4
Joe Baker-Cresswell, 96, English Royal Navy officer and aide-de-camp to King George VI.
Roger Brown, 54, American basketball player, colon cancer.
Leo Catozzo, 84, Italian film editor.
Robert H. Dicke, 80, American astronomer and physicist.
Stanley Fink, 61, American lawyer and politician, cancer.
Edward Klabiński, 76, Polish racing cyclist.
Robert Lampman, 76, American economist, lung cancer.
Carey Loftin, 83, American actor and stuntman.
Paul Préboist, 70, French actor.
József Simándy, 80, Hungarian tenor.

5
Zalman Abramov, 88, Israeli politician.
Amjad Ali, 89, Pakistani politician and a civil servant.
Samm Sinclair Baker, 87, American self-help writer.
Ralph Bass, 85, American R&B record producer.
Frank Brennan, 72, Scottish footballer.
Jean Dréville, 90, French film director.
William Roberts, 83, American screenwriter, respiratory failure.
Edmund Brinsley Teesdale, 81, Hong Kong Colonial Secretary.

6
Frank Anderson, 83, Australian rules football player.
Rosalyn Boulter, 80, British film actress.
Ed Furgol, 79, American golfer.
Cheddi Jagan, 78, President of Guyana.
Michael Manley, 72, Prime Minister of Jamaica (1972–1980; 1989–1992), prostate cancer.

7
Wilfred Conwell Bain, 89, American music educator.
Gösta Brännström, 70, Swedish sprinter and Olympian.
Chuck Green, 77, American tap dancer.
Martin Kippenberger, 44, German artist and sculptor, liver cancer.
Agnieszka Osiecka, 60, Polish poet, writer, film director and journalist, cancer.
Edward Mills Purcell, 84, American physicist, recipient of the Nobel Prize in Physics, respiratory failure.
Kim Yale, 43, American comic book writer and editor (Suicide Squad, Deadshot, Sgt. Rock), breast cancer.

8
Leon Danielian, 76, American ballet dancer, teacher, and choreographer.
Masuo Ikeda, 63, Japanese painter, printmaker, illustrator, sculptor, ceramist, novelist, and film director from Nagano Prefecture.
Gershon Liebman, 92, French rabbi and holocaust survivor.
Lefter Millo, 30, Albanian football player, car accident.
Alexander Salkind, 75, French-Mexican film producer (Superman).
Alfred Sheinwold, 85, American bridge player and writer, stroke.

9
The Notorious B.I.G., 24, American rapper ("Juicy", "Big Poppa", "Mo Money Mo Problems"), murdered.
Jean-Dominique Bauby, 44, French journalist and author (Elle magazine), pneumonia during locked-in syndrome.
John Boyd, 70, United States Air Force fighter pilot and military strategist, cancer.
Robert B. Leighton, 77, American experimental physicist.
John S. McKiernan, 85, American politician.
Terry Nation, 66, Welsh television writer (Doctor Who), emphysema.
Ray Prochaska, 77, American gridiron football player and coach.
Bezawada Gopala Reddy, 89, Indian politician.
Veronica Wedgwood, 86, English historian.
Dwight Locke Wilbur, 93, American medical doctor and president of the A.M.A.

10
Jimmy Airlie, 60, Scottish trade unionist, cancer.
LaVern Baker, 67, American R&B singer, cardiovascular disease.
Raymond Bass, 87, American Navy adniral, gymnast and Olympian.
Stan Drake, 75, American cartoonist.
Yorozuya Kinnosuke, 64, Japanese kabuki actor, pneumonia, laryngeal cancer.
David Moroder, 66, Italian luger and sculptor.
Imam Mustafayev, 87, Azerbaijani communist politician.
Ossie O'Brien, 68, British politician.
Wesley Ramey, 87, American boxer.
Ghulam Rasool Santosh, 68, Indian painter and poet.
Johannes Theodor Suhr, 101, Danish Roman Catholic bishop.
Wilf Wooller, 84, Welsh cricketer, rugby player, and journalist.
Hideo Ōba, 87, Japanese film director and screenwriter.

11
Lars Ahlin, 81, Swedish author and aesthetician.
Robert Browning, 83, Scottish Byzantinist.
Stefan Fernholm, 37, Swedish discus thrower, shot putter, and Olympian.
Hugh Lawson, 61, American jazz pianist, cancer.
Thikkurissy Sukumaran Nair, 80, Indian poet, playwright, film director and actor, kidney failure.
Hugo Weisgall, 84, American composer and conductor.

12
Shamsul-hasan Shams Barelvi, 79-80, Pakistani Islamic scholar.
Hendrik Brugmans, 90, Dutch academic and linguist.
Ernst-Georg Drünkler, 76, German Luftwaffe fighter ace during World War II.
Bertram Myron Gross, 84, American social scientist, congestive heart failure.
William Hare, 5th Earl of Listowel, 90, Anglo-Irish peer and Labour politician.
Wally Wolf, 66, American swimmer, water polo player, and Olympic champion.

13
Ronald Fraser, 66, English actor, haemorrhage.
Horace Kolimba, 57, Tanzanian politician.
Leo O'Brien, 89, Australian cricket player and sportsman.
Joe Repko, 76, American football coach and player.

14
Jurek Becker, 59, Polish-German writer, film author and GDR dissident, colorectal cancer.
Joseph Fuchs, 97, American classical violinist.
Alija Isaković, 65, Bosnian writer, publicist, and playwright.
Jim McConn, 68, American politician and mayor of Houston, Texas.
Nicolas Morn, 65, Luxembourgian cyclist and Olympian.
Terence O'Sullivan, 73, Irish Fianna Fáil politician.
Veerendra Patil, 73, Indian politician.
Fred Zinnemann, 89, Austrian-American film director (From Here to Eternity, A Man for All Seasons, High Noon), Oscar winner (1954), heart attack.

15
C. Arulampalam, 88, Sri Lankan Tamil politician.
Gail Davis, 71, American actress (Annie Oakley) and singer, cancer..
Victor Dumitrescu, 72, Romanian football player.
Svend Wiig Hansen, 74, Danish sculptor and painter.
Vernon Harrell, 56, American R&B singer and songwriter.
Kåre Holt, 80, Norwegian author.
Ed Kullman, 73, Canadian ice hockey player.
Dorab Patel, 72, Pakistani jurist and lawmaker, leukemia.
Victor Vasarely, 90, Hungarian-French artist, cancer.

16
Berta Bojetu, 51, Slovene writer, poet and actress.
Paal Frisvold, 89, Norwegian general.
Leda Gloria, 88, Italian actress.
Harry Holgate, 63, Australian politician and Premier of Tasmania, cancer.
Zvonko Monsider, 76, Croatian football goalkeeper.
John Montague Stow, 85, British colonial official.
Star Stowe, 40, American model and Playboy centerfold, murdered.
John White, 80, American rower and Olympian.

17
Prem Jayanth, 64, Sri Lankan actor and film producer.
Fritz Moravec, 74, Austrian mountaineer and author.
Charles G. Overberger, 76, American chemist, Parkinson's disease.
Ferenc Sipos, 64, Hungarian football player and trainer.
Jermaine Stewart, 39, American R&B singer, liver cancer.

18
Erik de Mauny, 76, English journalist and author.
Jean Fievez, 86, Belgian football player.
Wilbur Knorr, 51, American historian of mathematics, melanoma.
Ilse Schwidetzky, 89, German anthropologist.

19
José Crespo, 96, Spanish film actor.
Willem de Kooning, 92, Dutch abstract expressionist artist, Alzheimer's disease.
Jacques Foccart, 83, French businessman and politician.
Eugène Guillevic, 89, French poet.
Purnendu Pattrea, 66, Indian poet, writer, illustrator and film director.
Claude Pierson, 66, French film director, writer and producer.
Shoukry Sarhan, 72, Egyptian actor.
Mac Van Valkenburg, 75, American electrical engineer and university professor.

20
Ronnie Barron, 53, American actor and musician, heart problems, heart attack.
Jean Engstrom, 76, American actress.
Carlo Fassi, 67, Italian figure skater and coach.
Britt G. Hallqvist, 83, Swedish hymnwriter, poet, and translator.
Marino Marini, 72, Italian musician.
V. S. Pritchett, 96,British writer and literary critic.
Tony Zale, 83, American boxer, Alzheimer's disease.

21
Wilbert Awdry, 85, British children's author and The Railway Series creator.
Charles Booth, 72, British diplomat.
John Nemechek, 27, American NASCAR race car driver, complications from racing accident.
Pekka Parikka, 57, Finnish film director and screenwriter.

22
Lauritz Royal Christensen, 82, American epidemiologist.
Mary Peters Fieser, 87, American chemist.
James G. Stewart, 89, American sound engineer.
Harry Thode, 86, Canadian geochemist and nuclear chemist.

23
Timothy Joseph Harrington, 78, American prelate of the Roman Catholic Church.
Hugh Lawson, 85, British politician.
Pyotr Lushev, 73, Soviet Army general during the Cold war.
Pearson Mwanza, 29, Zambian football player.

24
Martin Caidin, 69, American author, screenwriter, and aviator, cancer.
U. Alexis Johnson, 88, American diplomat, pneumonia.
Bill Miller, 69, American professional wrestler, heart attack.
Roberto Sánchez Vilella, 84, Governor of Puerto Rico (1965–1969).

25
Baltazar, 71, Brazilian footballer.
Stan Coster, 66, Australian country music singer-songwriter.
Rosario Granados, 72, Argentine-Mexican film actress, heart attack.
Pedro Medina, 39, Cuban refugee and murder convict, execution by electric chair.
Norm Ryan, 86, Australian politician.
C. J. F. Williams, 66, British philosopher, cardiac arrest.

26
Norman Alexander, 89, New Zealand physicist.
Marshall Applewhite, 65, leader of the Heaven's Gate cult group, suicide.
Otto John, 88, German defector and spy.
Hartmut Losch, 53, German athlete.
George Post, 90, American watercolorist and art educator, pneumonia.
Nina Mason Pulliam, 90, American journalist, author, and civic leader, complications from respiratory infection.
Dickie Williams, 72, Welsh rugby player.

27
George Malcolm Brown, 71, English geologist.
David A. Clarke, 53, American civil-rights worker, attorney, and politician, PCNSL.
Bob Dillabough, 55, Canadian ice hockey player.
Lane Dwinell, 90, American manufacturer and politician, heart failure.
Hugh Horner, 72, Canadian physician and politician, heart attack.
Charles Lillard, 53, American-Canadian poet and historian.
Ella Maillart, 94, Swiss adventurer, travel writer and photographer.
Benno Premsela, 76, Dutch designer, visual artist and art collector.
Émile Stijnen, 89, Belgian footballer.

28
Arthur Arntzen, 90, Norwegian politician.
Lesley Cunliffe, 51, American journalist and writer, stomach cancer.
Claro Duany, 79, Cuban baseball player.
Tai Kanbara, 98, Japanese poet, painter, author, art critic and Japanese futurism pioneer, heart failure.

29
George William Gregory Bird, 80, British medical doctor, researcher and haematologist, renal failure.
Hans-Walter Eigenbrodt, 61, German football player.
Wilhelm Friedrich de Gaay Fortman, 85, Dutch politician and jurist.
Finn Høffding, 98, Danish composer.
Aleksandr Ivanov, 68, Soviet football player.
Pupul Jayakar, 81, Indian cultural activist and writer.
Norman Pirie, 89, British biochemist and virologist.
Ellen Pollock, 94, British actress.
Hans Quest, 81, German actor and film director, cancer.
Anthony Roberts, 41, American basketball player, shot.
Eddie Ryder, 74, American actor, writer, and television director.
Ruth Sager, 79, American geneticist, bladder cancer.
Gordon Stephenson, 88, British-Australian town planner and architect.
Edmundo Pisano Valdés, 77, Chilean plant ecologist, botanist and agronomist, stomach cancer.

30
Jack Bernhard, 82, American film and television director.
Bill Smith, 62, American baseball player.
Jon Stone, 64, American writer, director and producer, ALS.
Maria Śliwka, 61, Polish volleyball player.
Tadeusz Żenczykowski, 90, Polish lawyer and political activist.

31
Eugenie Anderson, 87, American diplomat.
Friedrich Hund, 101, German physicist.
John Norman Davidson Kelly, 87, British theologian and academic.
Marvin Liebman, 73, American activist and gay rights advocate.
Dorothy Liu, 62, Hong Kong pro-Beijing politician and lawyer, pancreatic cancer
Stephen Kalong Ningkan, 76, Malaysian politician.
Lyman Spitzer, 82, American theoretical physicist and astronomer, heart disease.

References 

1997-03
 03